Morinia longirostris is a species of cluster fly in the family Polleniidae.

Distribution
South Africa.

References

Polleniidae
Insects described in 1977
Diptera of Africa